Velli Vitiyar was a Sangam poet. Poems by her are included in the poetry anthology Kuṟuntokai.

References

Female poets of the Sangam Age
Year of birth unknown
Year of death unknown